The following is a list of awards and nominations received by American actor Paul Rudd.

Awards and nominations

Other honors

Footnotes

References

Rudd, Paul